The Williams Avenue YWCA, also known as the Billy Webb Elks Lodge, is an historic building in north Portland, Oregon. Listed on the National Register of Historic Places in 2020, the structure was heavily damaged by fire in 2021.

References

Buildings and structures in Portland, Oregon
Eliot, Portland, Oregon
National Register of Historic Places in Portland, Oregon
North Portland, Oregon